Kemper may refer to:

Buildings
 Kemper Arena, in Kansas City, Missouri
 Kemper Building (Chicago), a skyscraper in Chicago, Illinois
 Kemper Hall, a 1911 mansion in Kenosha, Wisconsin
 Kemper Museum of Contemporary Art, in Kansas City, Missouri

Companies
 Thomas Kemper, an American soda brewing company
 Kemper Corporation, an American insurance group

Places
 Quimper, France
 Kemper County, Mississippi
 Kemper, Illinois
 Kemper, South Carolina

People

Surname
 Andreas Kemper (born 1963), German sociologist
Charles Kemper (1900–1950), American film actor
 Christine de Bosch Kemper (1840–1924), Dutch feminist
 David Kemper (born 1947), American rock drummer
 David Kemper (writer), American television writer and producer
 Dieter Kemper (1937–2018), German cyclist
 Edmund Kemper (born 1948), American serial killer and necrophile
 Ellie Kemper (born 1980), American actress and comedian
 Franz-Josef Kemper (born 1945), German middle-distance runner
 Frederick T. Kemper (1816–1881), American school-founder
 Hermann Kemper (1892–1977), German electrical engineer and inventor
 Hunter Kemper (born 1976), American triathlete
 Jackson Kemper (1789–1870), American Episcopalian bishop
 James L. Kemper (1823–1895), Confederate general in the American Civil War and governor of Virginia, U.S.
 James S. Kemper (1886–1981), American insurance company founder and billionaire
 Jeltje de Bosch Kemper (1836–1916), Dutch feminist
 Joan Melchior Kemper (1776–1824), Dutch jurist and politician
 Johan Kemper (1670–1716), Polish Christian Kabbalist
 Johnny Kemper, American bodybuilder and actor
 Kay Ann Kemper, stage name of Kay Lenz (born 1954), American actor
 Kathy Kemper, American tennis coach, columnist and CEO
 R. Crosby Kemper (1892–1972), American banker and philanthropist
 R. Crosby Kemper, Jr. (1927–2014), American banker and philanthropist
 Reuben Kemper (1770–1826), American filibuster
 Samuel Kemper (died 1814), American filibuster
 Sandy Kemper (born 1965), American financial entrepreneur
 Tom Kempers (born 1969), Dutch tennis player
 Victor J. Kemper (born 1927), American cinematographer
 William Thornton Kemper, Sr. (1866–1938), American banker and entrepreneur

Given name
 Kemper Freeman (born 1941), American real estate developer
 Kemper Goodwin (1906–1997), American architect
 Kemper Harreld (1885–1971), African-American concert violinist
 Kemper Nomland (1919–2009), American architect 
 Kemper Yancey (1887–1957), American football player and coach

Other uses
 Kemper: The CoEd Killer, a 2008 film
 Kemper Insurance Open, a former golf tournament in Potomac, Maryland
 Kemper Lakes Golf Club, Kildeer, Illinois
 Kemper Military School, in Boonville, Missouri, U.S.
 Kemper Project, an energy project in Kemper County, Mississippi